The Best of Split Enz is a compilation by New Zealand rock band Split Enz, and not to be confused with History Never Repeats – The Best of Split Enz. Mainly featuring tracks from the 1976–1983 period, the album was released in the UK, the Netherlands and the US only.

Track listing
 "Titus" [1976 version] 3:15 (Phil Judd)
 "Late Last Night" [album version] 4:04 (Phil Judd)
 "129 (Matinee Idyll)" [1976 version] 2:56 (Phil Judd/Tim Finn)
 "Lovey Dovey" [1976 version] 3:08 (Phil Judd/Tim Finn)
 "Time for a Change" [1976 version] 4:06 (Phil Judd)
 "Crosswords" 3:24 (Tim Finn)
 "Charley" 5:29 (Tim Finn)
 "Another Great Divide" 3:40 (Phil Judd/Tim Finn/Eddie Rayner/Robert Gillies)
 "Bold as Brass" 3:29 (Tim Finn/Robert Gillies)
 "My Mistake" 3:01 (Tim Finn/Eddie Rayner)
 "I See Red" [faded out version] 3:14 (Tim Finn)
 "I Got You" 3:29 (Neil Finn)
 "One Step Ahead" 2:53 (Neil Finn)
 "History Never Repeats" 2:58 (Neil Finn)
 "Six Months in a Leaky Boat" [A&M 7" edit] 3:14 (Tim Finn/Split Enz)
 "Message to My Girl" 3:58 (Neil Finn)

References

1993 greatest hits albums
Split Enz compilation albums